Tatchun was an electoral district which returned an MLA to the Legislative Assembly of the Yukon Territory in Canada. It was created in 1978 out of the ridings of Klondike and Pelly River. It was abolished in 1992 when it was amalgamated with the riding of Mayo to form the riding of Mayo-Tatchun.

The district included the communities of Carmacks, Pelly Crossing, and Little Salmon. It was situated on the historical territory of the Selkirk First Nation, the First Nation of Na-Cho Nyäk Dun, the Little Salmon/Carmacks First Nation, and the Ross River Dena Council of the Kaska Dena. At creation, the population of the electorate was 325 voters and by abolition it was 418 voters.

When partisan politics was introduced to the Yukon in the 1978 election, Tatchun was one of the initial electoral districts established. At the time, it was one of the Yukon's nine rural ridings. It was bordered by the ridings of Mayo, Klondike, Faro, Kluane, Hootalinqua, and Campbell.

Tatchun is also the former seat of Roger Coles, leader of the Yukon Liberal Party from 1984 to 1986. He later resigned both his seat and his position as leader after being sentenced to prison time for cocaine trafficking.

MLAs

Electoral results

1989 general election

|-

| NDP
| Danny Joe
| align="right"| 165
| align="right"| 47.8%
| align="right"| +6.6%
|-

|-

| Liberal
| Luke Lacasse
| align="right"| 71
| align="right"| 20.6%
| align="right"| -10.3%
|-
! align left colspan=3|Total
! align=right| 345
! align=right| 100.0%
! align=right| –
|}

By-Election: 1987

|-

| NDP
| Danny Joe
| align="right"| 149
| align="right"| 41.2%
| align="right"| +7.1%
|-

| Liberal
| Elijah Smith
| align="right"| 112
| align="right"| 30.9%
| align="right"| -10.5%
|-

|-

| Independent
| Ray A. Jackson
| align="right"| 8
| align="right"| 2.2%
| align="right"| +2.2%
|-
! align left colspan=3|Total
! align=right| 362
! align=right| 100.0%
! align=right| –
|}
 On the resignation of Roger Coles.

1985 general election

|-

| Liberal
| Roger Coles
| align="right"| 159
| align="right"| 41.4%
| align="right"| +8.6%
|-

| NDP
| Victor Mitander
| align="right"| 131
| align="right"| 34.1%
| align="right"| +1.9%
|-

|-
! align left colspan=3|Total
! align=right| 384
! align=right| 100.0%
! align=right| –
|}

1982 general election

|-

|-

| Liberal
| Roger Coles
| align="right"| 103
| align="right"| 32.8%
| align="right"| -5.9%
|-

| NDP
| Bill Larson
| align="right"| 101
| align="right"| 32.2%
| align="right"| +0.8%
|-
! align left colspan=3|Total
! align=right| 314
! align=right| 100.0%
! align=right| –
|}

1978 general election

|-

|-

| NDP
| Jerry Roberts
| align="right"| 83
| align="right"| 31.4%
| align="right"| –
|-

| Liberal
| Hugh Netzel
| align="right"| 71
| align="right"| 26.9%
| align="right"| –
|-
! align left colspan=3|Total
! align=right| 264
! align=right| 100.0%
! align=right| –
|}

References 

Former Yukon territorial electoral districts